Thomas Hill Standpipe, which holds  of water, is a riveted wrought iron tank with a wood frame jacket located on Thomas Hill in Bangor, Maine, United States. Built in 1897, it is an architecturally distinctive city landmark, and was listed on the National Register of Historic Places in 1974.



History
Built in 1897, it is the district's oldest standpipe and has been in use since its construction.  Its purpose is the same today as when it was built; to help regulate Bangor's water pressure in the downtown area and to provide water storage for emergencies. In 1895, it was discovered that the city pumping station contained faulty equipment, risking the possibility of a city water shortage.

The land had been owned previously by brothers James and Charles Thomas.

The original specifications for the standpipe consisted of four single-sided legal pages, and, unusually, gave the architect the right to freely change the labor and material costs without voiding the contract. The final construction cost was $295,109.36.

Originally, the exterior was painted dark gray with the pillars and lattice work painted white.  During World War II, the standpipe was painted olive drab for camouflage purposes, because of its proximity to Dow Army Airfield, but it was repainted white in 1949.  While once open to the public, it was closed during the war, following a 1940 accident in which a 12-year-old boy was killed when he fell while climbing on the beams under the stairway.

Bangor Water District assumed ownership of the standpipe in 1957 when a quasi-municipal (separate from the city) water district was formed.

Recently, a fire detection system and a "dry" sprinkler system which can be filled from an outside hydrant were added to protect the landmark structure.

Structure

The standpipe is really two structures in one. The standpipe itself consists of steel plates riveted one outside the other.

The 24 main posts which extend up past the observation deck begin at the base of the structure.

Along the interior wall of the façade is a winding staircase which leads to the promenade deck encircling the top of the building.

The exterior of the building is clad in wooden shingles, and the line of windows that illuminate the inside stairs are topped by hoods in the then-popular Shingle style of architecture.  To erect the wooden part of the structure took  of hard pine and 22,000 cedar shingles. James M. Davis of Bangor, who had recently built the original Bangor Auditorium in only 22 days, set up a portable saw mill and blacksmith shop on the site and employed 22 men.  The entire project took about six months to complete, and was filled starting in June 1898.

The lights around the top of the Standpipe are sometimes referred to as "the crown on the Queen City".

Tour Schedule
Currently the promenade deck is opened up four times a year to visitors, once every season.

Landmark Status
The standpipe is listed on the National Register of Historic Places.  In 1980, it was designated as an American Water Landmark by the American Water Works Association. It was designated as a Maine Historic Civil Engineering Landmark by the  American Society of Civil Engineers in 2008.

Geography
It is located northwest of downtown Bangor, atop Thomas Hill.

References

External links
Thomas Hill Standpipe, Bangor Water District
Bangor in Focus: Thomas Hill Standpipe

Buildings and structures in Bangor, Maine
Water towers on the National Register of Historic Places in Maine
Shingle Style architecture in Maine
Tourist attractions in Bangor, Maine
National Register of Historic Places in Bangor, Maine
1897 establishments in Maine
Infrastructure completed in 1897